The Horse Range is a mountain range in Josephine County, Oregon.

References 

Mountain ranges of Oregon
Landforms of Josephine County, Oregon